Neetze is a river of Lower Saxony, Germany. It is a left tributary of the Ilmenau.

See also
List of rivers of Lower Saxony

References

Rivers of Lower Saxony
Rivers of Germany